Cassia Pike (born 27 December 2000) is a Welsh professional footballer who plays as a striker for Liverpool F.C. Women of the FA Women's Super League.

Pike was born in Porthmadog and has played for Liverpool her entire career.

Early life 
Pike was born in Porthmadog, Wales. Pike studied BTEC Level 3 Sport (Developing coaching and Fitness) at Coleg Menai.

Club career
Pike joined Liverpool at the age of 9 and has stayed there ever since.

In the 2017/18 season, Pike was promoted to the senior team. She made her debut on 5 December 2017 against Sunderland in a 1–0 loss in the WSL Cup coming on for Ashley Hodson in the 76th minute. On 27 January 2018, Pike made her home and league debut in a 2–0 win coming on in the 81st minute for Jessica Clarke.

Career statistics

Club

References 

2000 births
Welsh women's footballers
People from Porthmadog
Sportspeople from Gwynedd
Liverpool F.C. Women players
Living people
Women's association football forwards